Southside Looking In is the first album from Minneapolis hip hop artist Manny Phesto, It was released independently in 2014.

Music
The entire record is produced by Mike the Martyr. It features guest appearances from Axel Foley, Greg Grease, Akrite, Metasota, as well as Mike the Martyr.

Reception
Critical response to Southside Looking In was favorable. Pitchfork listed it in the "Best MN Hip-Hop Releases of 2014".  City Pages named it one of "The Best Minnesota Rap Albums of 2014". 89.3FM The Current gave it their "Album of the Year" title
Several critics on Reviler.org and the journalists who participated in Twin Cities Critics Tally placed this album in their top ten list for 2014.

Track listing

External links
 Official website
 Official website
 Manny Phesto on Discogs

References

Manny Phesto albums
2014 debut albums